The 2nd Infantry Division/ROK-US Combined Division Sustainment Brigade is a sustainment brigade of the United States Army. It provides logistical support to the 2nd Infantry Division, the Republic of Korea Army's 8th Infantry Division, and all U.S. Army Units garrisoned on the Korean Peninsula. Formerly the 501st Sustainment Brigade, it was reflagged the 2ID SBDE on 7 July 2015 and became a direct reporting unit to the 2nd Infantry Division.

History
The history of the 501st Corps Support Group began with the activation of the 501st Quartermaster Battalion. The battalion was activated on 29 July 1944 in England. On 28 October, the battalion was moved to France and later Germany where it earned campaign participation streamer with inscription for the European-African-Middle Eastern Theater. The 501st returned to the United States on 18 July 1945 where it was stationed at Camp Lee, Virginia.

On 20 February 1950, the 501st Quartermaster Battalion joined the Eighth United States Army in Korea. For its action in the Korean War the 501st earned a Meritorious Unit Commendation, a Republic of Korea Presidential Unit Citation, and campaign participation streamers for the second Korean Winter, Korean Summer-Fall 1952, Third Korean Winter, and Korean Summer 1953.

On 21 February 1958, the unit was inactivated in the Republic of Korea. It was redesigned on 7 April 1966 as the 501st Field Depot and activated 1 June 1966 at Granite City Army Depot, Illinois. The 501st Field Depot performed duty with the United States Army Pacific on 8 February 1967 when it was stationed in Thailand. The 501st Field Depot was inactivated in Thailand on 20 December 1968.

On 16 April 1986 the 501st Support Group was reactivated and designated the 501st Support Group (Corps) at Yongsan, Korea. On 28 February 1991 the 501st Support Group (Corps) moved to Camp Red Cloud, Korea. On 13 October 2006 it became the 501st Sustainment Brigade and moved south to Camp Carroll, near the city of Daegu.
On 17 Dec 2013 501st Sustainment Brigade was recognized as the best Sustainment Brigade in the entire Korean peninsula.

Subordinate units
Special Troops Battalion
Headquarters and Headquarters Company (HHC) (Camp Carroll)
 194th Division Sustainment Support Battalion (formerly the 194th Maintenance Battalion)
HHC (Camp Humphreys)
Charlie Company (Camp Casey) (formerly 46th Composite Truck Company) 
61st Maintenance Company (Camp Casey)
Alpha Company (Camp Humphreys) (formerly 348th Quartermaster Company) 
Bravo Support Maintenance Company (Camp Humphreys) (formerly 520th Maintenance Company)

References
2D Infantry Division/ROK-US Combined Division Sustainment Brigade, official website
501stSBDE FaceBook
The Institute of Heraldry: 501st Sustainment Brigade
For More information about South Korea go to This link

501
Military units of the United States Army in South Korea
Military units and formations established in 1986